Isao Rafael Cruz Alonso (born 5 August 1982) is a Cuban Paralympic judoka who competes in international elite events. He is a double Paralympic champion and a World silver medalist.

References

1982 births
Living people
People from Villa Clara Province
Paralympic judoka of Cuba
Judoka at the 2000 Summer Paralympics
Judoka at the 2008 Summer Paralympics
Judoka at the 2012 Summer Paralympics
Medalists at the 2000 Summer Paralympics
Medalists at the 2008 Summer Paralympics
Medalists at the 2012 Summer Paralympics
Medalists at the 2007 Parapan American Games
Medalists at the 2011 Parapan American Games
Cuban male judoka
20th-century Cuban people
21st-century Cuban people